Eduruleni Manishi may refer to:
 Eduruleni Manishi (1975 film)
 Eduruleni Manishi (2001 film)